Agung Supriyanto (born 14 June 1992 in Jepara, Central Java) is an Indonesian professional footballer who plays as a forward for Liga 2 club Persekat Tegal.

Personal life 
Supriyanto was born on 14 June 1992. He enlisted in the Army through special selection on sport after graduating from highschool.

Per January 2015, he is a second sergeant in the Indonesian Army's military police.

He claimed that his main profession is a soldier and football is only a hobby.

Career

Club
Supriyanto played for PPSM Kartika Nusantara Magelang after graduating from army training for 18 month.

In September 2014, while Supriyanto was still contracted to Persija, he played for internal amateur competition in Indonesian Armed Forces, Piala TNI 2014, for his own branch team PSAD (Army football club) and won the cup.

On December 25, 2014, he was announced as a Persebaya Bhayangkara player.

International 
During his time at PPSM KN Magelang, Supriyanto played for Indonesia U-22 in Asian Cup U-22 qualification.

He made his international debut for the Indonesia national team in 2013.

International goals 
Agung Supriyanto: International under-23 goals

Honours

International
Indonesia U-23
Islamic Solidarity Games  Silver medal: 2013

References

External links 
 
 Agung Supriyanto at Liga Indonesia

Indonesian footballers
Indonesia international footballers
Living people
1992 births
Indonesian military personnel
Javanese people
PPSM Magelang players
Persijap Jepara players
Persija Jakarta players
Liga 1 (Indonesia) players
Indonesian Premier Division players
Indonesia youth international footballers
Association football forwards
Sportspeople from Central Java